Flynn Adam Atkins (born August 3, 1973) is an American producer, singer and rapper originating from Los Angeles, California. He is currently independent and has released an EP: Bang the Drums.  Flynn Adam has also been featured numerous times on RadioU and TVU for his music video, "Such a Time", and is an active member of the hip hop music duo Rootbeer. He was also a member of famed Christian hip-hop group LA Symphony which is currently on hiatus.

Albums and EPs

In 1996, Flynn Adam created Eartube Empire to release his first EP titled Memoirs under the name Flynn Adam Atkins.

After releasing Memoirs, Flynn Adam Atkins released his first full-length studio album titled Louder in 1997.  It was re-released in 2003.

In 2000, Flynn Adam Atkins went under the name, "Flynn" and released the album Burnt Out on the Microcker label.  The album cover was designed like a giant matchbook.

In 2004, Flynn signed to ILLECT Recordings and released the experimental hip hop album, In Like Flynn.

After five years of near inactivity with his solo work mainly due to time involved with LA Symphony, Flynn came back as Flynn Adam and released three digital EPs within the same year, which included three music videos, along with one hard copy album which included a compilation of the three EPs.  In January, Flynn Adam released the digital EP, Such a Time, including the title track and matching music video which became almost instant hits on RadioU and TVU.  Within just more than two months, Flynn Adam released another digital-only EP titled Dishes and another titled Adios. In May 2009, a hard compilation of the three EPs was released called 500,000 Boomin' Watts and was available only from the Gotee Records online store or from Flynn Adams official store.

Discography

Albums

EPs

References

External links 
Official Website

Living people
1973 births
Rappers from Los Angeles
Gotee Records artists
21st-century American rappers